Douglas Renato de Jesus (born 9 March 1983), known simply as Douglas, is a Brazilian former footballer who played as a goalkeeper.

He spent most of his professional career with Vitória de Guimarães, having signed in 2011 from Ipatinga. He won the 2012–13 Taça de Portugal with the club, appearing in 235 competitive matches.

Club career

Early career
Douglas was born in Ribeirão Preto, São Paulo, and started his career with hometown club Botafogo Futebol Clube (SP). In 2006 he joined Iraty Sport Club, but returned to his native state in the following year after signing for Olímpia Futebol Clube.

After winning the year's Campeonato Paulista Série A3, Douglas moved to neighbouring Sertãozinho Futebol Clube in the Série C.

Santos
On 6 February 2008, Douglas was presented at Série A side Santos FC after agreeing to a three-year contract. During his first season he started ahead of Fábio Costa and Felipe, playing 17 matches to help his team finish in the 15th position.

Douglas was demoted to third choice in 2009, and was loaned to Ipatinga Futebol Clube of the Série B on 23 January 2010. Upon returning, he left Santos as his contract expired.

Vitória Guimarães
In January 2011, aged nearly 28, Douglas moved to Portugal and signed with Vitória S.C. from Guimarães. He made his Primeira Liga debut on 5 May 2012 in a 3–1 away win against C.D. Feirense, but spent his first two seasons as backup to compatriot Nilson.

Douglas became the starter from the 2012–13 campaign onwards, occasionally splitting the minutes with Assis Giovanaz first and youth graduate Miguel Silva later. On 26 May 2013, he was on goal as Vitória won their first ever Taça de Portugal after defeating S.L. Benfica 2–1.

On 12 August 2020, after announcing his retirement, Douglas was named academy goalkeeper coach at the Estádio D. Afonso Henriques.

Honours
Olímpia
Campeonato Paulista Série A3: 2007

Vitória Guimarães
Taça de Portugal: 2012–13

References

External links

1983 births
Living people
Brazilian footballers
Footballers from São Paulo (state)
Association football goalkeepers
Campeonato Brasileiro Série A players
Campeonato Brasileiro Série B players
Campeonato Brasileiro Série C players
Botafogo Futebol Clube (SP) players
Iraty Sport Club players
Sertãozinho Futebol Clube players
Santos FC players
Ipatinga Futebol Clube players
Primeira Liga players
Vitória S.C. players
Brazilian expatriate footballers
Expatriate footballers in Portugal
Brazilian expatriate sportspeople in Portugal